Aeroput was the Yugoslav flag-carrier until 1948. This is a list of destinations that the carrier served until then.

Besides flying to numerous airports and airfields of its destinations, Aeroput also used seaplane stations at Belgrade, Dubrovnik, Split, Divulje, Sušak, Kumbor (Kotor) and Vodice (Šibenik).

The Bucharest - Belgrade - Zagreb - Venice - Milan - Turin route was operated in cooperation with Italian Ala Littoria and Franco-Romanian CIDNA.

List

See also
 List of Jat Airways destinations
 Air Serbia destinations

References

A
Aeroput